Hegardt is the surname of a Swedish noble family.

Josias Hegardt (died 1727), reported to have been born in Borken in Holstein, was the oldest known ancestor. Josias Hegardt was the steward of Svenstorp in Odarslöv parish in the county of Malmöhus presently Skåne County. After his death the family moved to the parish of Igelösa in the same county of Malmöhus and Skåne. Christian Bernhard Hegardt (1781–1837), the great-grandson of Josias Hegardt, was a diplomat and undersecretary of state. He was raised to the nobility on 11 May 1818 according to the Swedish Instrument of Government of 1809, meaning that only the head of the family has noble grace. The family was introduced into the House of Nobility on 20 March 1819. 

The Grant of Arms has been kept in the Swedish House of Nobility (Riddarhuset in Swedish) since 1967.

See also
List of Swedish noble families

References

External links
Riddarhuset

Swedish noble families